The 1940 USC Trojans football team represented the University of Southern California (USC) in the 1940 college football season. In their 16th year under head coach Howard Jones, the Trojans compiled a 3–4–2 record (2–3–2 against conference opponents), finished in seventh place in the Pacific Coast Conference, and were outscored by their opponents by a combined total of 98 to 88.

Schedule

References

USC
USC Trojans football seasons
USC Trojans football